is a city located in Ibaraki Prefecture, Japan. , the city had an estimated population of 39,281 in 16.047 households and a population density of 220 persons per km². The percentage of the population aged over 65 was 37.6%.

Geography
Hitachiōmiya is located in the northwestern part of Ibaraki Prefecture, at the eastern foot of the Yamizo Mountains, with 59% of the city area classified as forest and mountains. The Kuji River runs from north to south in the eastern part of the city, along which Japan National Route 118 and the JR Suigun Line pass. The city center is located in the southeast. The Naka River flows in the southwestern part of the city.

Surrounding municipalities
Ibaraki Prefecture
Hitachiōta
 Naka
 Shirosato
 Daigo
Tochigi Prefecture
Nasukarasuyama
Nakagawa

Climate
Hitachiōmiya has a Humid continental climate (Köppen Cfa) characterized by warm summers and cold winters with heavy snowfall.

Demographics
Per Japanese census data, the population of Hitachiōmiya has been declining over the past 70 years.

History
The town of Ōmiya was created within Naka District with the establishment of the modern municipalities system on April 1, 1889. The city of Hitachiōmiya was established on October 16, 2004, from the merger of  Ōmiya with the neighboring villages of Miwa and Ogawa (all from Naka District), the town of Yamagata, and the village of Gozenyama (both from Higashiibaraki District).

Government
Hitachiōmiya has a mayor-council form of government with a directly elected mayor and a unicameral city council of 18 members. Hitachiōmiya contributes one member to the Ibaraki Prefectural Assembly. In terms of national politics, the city is divided between Ibaraki 1st district and Ibaraki 5th district of the lower house of the Diet of Japan.

Economy
The economy of Hitachiōmiya is primarily agricultural.

Education
Hitachiōmiya has 11 public elementary schools and five public middle schools operated by the city government, and two public high schools operated by the Ibaraki Prefectural Board of Education.

Transportation

Railway
 JR East –Suigun Line
  –  –  –  –  –

Highway

Local attractions

Notable people from Hitachiōmiya 
Miho Shiraishi, actress
Dōmei Yakazu, physician

References

External links

Official Website 

Cities in Ibaraki Prefecture
Hitachiōmiya, Ibaraki